Cowichan  may refer either to:

the Cowichan Tribes First Nation located in and around Duncan, British Columbia
the Cowichan Valley, a region on Vancouver Island centred on Duncan, British Columbia, which contains:
 Cowichan Valley Regional District, a supra-municipal regional government
Cowichan Lake, a 30 km long body of water
the town of Lake Cowichan
Cowichan River
Cowichan Bay, British Columbia, a bay and community.
the Cowichan sweater, a heavy-wool knit animal and geometric patterns made by the women of the Cowichan people.

British Columbia provincial electoral districts

Cowichan - 1871-1920
Cowichan-Alberni, 1894 only
Cowichan-Newcastle 1920 - 1963
Cowichan-Malahat 1966-1986
Cowichan-Ladysmith 1991–2005
Nanaimo-North Cowichan 2009–present

Canadian federal electoral districts

Cowichan—Malahat—The Islands 1976 - 1987
Nanaimo—Cowichan 1987–2015
Nanaimo—Cowichan—The Islands 1962 - 1976
Cowichan—Malahat—Langford 2015-present 

Other
 Cowichan Herald Extraordinary, one of the officers of arms at the Canadian Heraldic Authority

Transportation
 , a steamship that operated in British Columbia from 1908 to 1925.
 , the name of three vessels in the Canadian Navy;
 , a Canadian Bangor-class minesweeper commissioned in 1941 and sold in 1946.
 , a Canadian Bay-class minesweeper commissioned in 1953 and sold to France in 1954.
 , a Canadian Bay-class minesweeper commissioned in 1957 and decommissioned in 1997 .